Erpodiaceae is a family of haplolepideous mosses (Dicranidae) in the order Dicranales. It consists of six genera.

Genera

The family Erpodiaceae contains six genera:

Aulacopilum 
Erpodium  
Solmsiella 
Tricherpodium 
Venturiella 
Wildia

References

Moss families
Dicranales